Amlodipine/atorvastatin, sold under the brand name Caduet among others, is a fixed-dose combination medication for the treatment of high cholesterol and high blood pressure. It contains a statin and a calcium channel blocker.

Society and culture

Brand names 
Amlodipine/atorvastatin is marketed under the brand name Caduet in the United States, Australia, and Russia, and Envacar in the Philippines.

References

External links 
 

Combination drugs
Pfizer brands